Milajerd is a city in Markazi Province, Iran.

Milajerd or Milajord may also refer to:
 Milajerd, Hamadan
 Milajerd, Isfahan
 Milajerd District, in Markazi Province
 Milajerd Rural District, in Markazi Province